Ricardo Llorca (born 1958, Alicante) is a Spanish-American Composer based in New York City since 1988. Llorca is a Juilliard School graduate and a faculty member of "The Juilliard School of Music Evening Division" since 1995. In addition, he is a Composer-in-residence for the New York-based contemporary dance company Henning Rübsam's Sensedance " and a composer-in-residence of NYOS ("The New York Opera Society") since 2008. His work includes operas such as "Las Horas Vacías" ("The Empty Hours") and the opera "Tres Sombreros de Copa " ("Three Top Hats"). Llorca is also a composer of symphonic, chamber, choral, and music for theater, movies, and television. Some of Ricardo Llorca's sources for his thematic inspiration are taken from his Mediterranean roots, mixed with elements of contemporary music. In his music, there are also influences from North American music and from "Downtown New York", more specifically from minimal and post-minimal composers such as Philip Glass or John Adams.

Career

Cultural management 
Throughout his career, Ricardo Llorca has collaborated with public and private institutions to promote contemporary and classical music in general. Since 2008 he has been working as Composer-in-Residence and deputy director at The New York Opera Society, collaborating with Jennifer Cho in organizing concerts and cultural events, seeking sponsorships, programming and selecting artists, etc. Examples of this are the four seasons in which he has organized, through NYOS, the Christmas Concerts of the Italian Embassy in Washington DC; various chamber music recitals at the Smithsonian Museum and the National Gallery in Washington DC; the World Financial Center in New York City; the United Nations Dag Hammarskjold Auditorium; the Chicago Cultural Center; the Teresa Carreño Auditorium in Caracas; the Sao Pedro Theater in São Paulo, the Tapia Theater and the Ibero-American Festival of Arts in Puerto Rico, among others.

Also since 1994 he has been a music programmer and member of the Cultural Committee of the Queen Sofia Spanish Institute in New York City where he has organised recitals and concerts with figures such as Giuliano Belotti, Mac McClure, Nancy Fabiola Herrera, Veronica Villarroel, Rosa Torres- Pardo, Carmen Bravo de Mompou, Alex Garrobé, etc.

Style 
In the words of the author: "We composers do not necessarily have to explain what we do, since many times what we write is nothing more than a mere product of our intuition and not of reflection. Also, when we compose we have to forget about the technique, as much as we can, and get carried away by what we want to express at a given time. I also try to move away from composing "collages" or any other obvious form of  "eclecticism"  trying to achieve a unity of language, a solid structure from the beginning to the end of the work. Then, there is no doubt that in recent years artistic trends have been less and less radical. Looking back, specifically to the 1980s, one can recognise a wide movement towards a more traditional and conservative orientation among composers of different temperaments and stylistic ideas. Obviously, I am one of them".

Rubén Jordán writes in his essay "An Approach to Transfigured History": “Ricardo Llorca's music also stands out for its duality. The duality of clear formal structures and the development of materials based on intuition and traditional compositional techniques, all filtered by a hint of minimalism in which everything is relevant, fresh and brave."

Another aspect of Llorca's compositional tasks is that he is also the author of the librettos and texts of some of his works. His are the lyrics of "The Dark Side" and "Tres sombreros de Copa", and the original libretto of "Las Horas Vacías".

Selected works 

Since "The Dark Side", premiered in 1993 by the mezzo-soprano Cheryl Marshall at Paul Recital Hall (The Juilliard School, New York City), or "El Combat del Somni", the work of Ricardo Llorca has left its mark in the audiences and with the critics.

Later came "Three Pieces for Piano and Orchestra", a work premiered in 1999 by the Orquesta de la Radiotelevisión Española at the Monumental Theater in Madrid; the "Concerto Italiano, for flute, guitar, harpsichord and string orchestra", a work commissioned by the Centro Para La Difusión de la Música Contemporánea and premiered in 2002 at the National Auditorium in Madrid; "Three Academic Pieces for Piano": I "Sarao", II "Coral", III "Fuga", a work commissioned by the Queen Sofía Spanish Institute of New York in 2000 and premiered by Mac Maclure in the Carlos IV Hall of the Spanish Institute in New York City.

We also highlight "Thermidor" (for organ and symphony orchestra), a work commissioned by the National Orchestra of Spain  premiered at the National Auditorium of Madrid in 2014. Or "Borderline ", a work commissioned by the CDNM (Centro para la Documentación National de la Música) and by the pianist Rosa Torres-Pardo.

His first opera "Las Horas Vacías" was premiered during the "XII Setmana de Música Sacra de Benidorm" in 2007, it has subsequently traveled to Berlin, Saint Petersburg, New York, São Paulo and Lithuania, and has been premiered in a stage version in November 2021 at the Teatros del Canal in Madrid, in co-production with the Teatro Real. According to critics:

His second opera is "Tres Sombreros de Copa" ("Three Top Hats"), a work commissioned by The New York Opera Society and based on the original work by Miguel Mihura. This work was premiered at the Sergio Cardoso Theater in São Paulo on 26 and 28 November 2017; and later performed at the Teatro de la Zarzuela in Madrid in 2019. The critics referred to it in the following terms: “…the illusion , tenderness, absurdity, impossible love, indecision, brilliant madness. All this fits into the delicious work of Miguel Mihura, which is now perfected with the serious, important, well-executed music of a prestigious composer and which demonstrates his undoubted quality…" or

Awards 

 "Richard Rogers Scholarship, 1992"
 Award "Virgen de la Almudena, 1999"
 "American Chamber Music Award, 1994"
 "John Simon Guggenheim Scholarship, 2001"

Recordings 
"Tres piezas para piano y orquesta" ("El Tiempo Malherido") /"RTVE Música"/ 2004
"Concierto Italiano" /"Columna Música"/2005

"Tres Piezas para Piano Académica" /Columna Música/2005 /RTVE Música /2005

"The Dark Side"/Columna Música/2005

"Las Horas Vacias - The Empty Hours" / Columna Música/ 2011

"Handeliana"/ Naxos/ 2013

Catalog

Music for Theatre, Cinema and Television

References

External links 
 https://www.ricardollorca.com/
 https://www.informacion.es/cultura/2017/03/22/haendel-siglo-xxi-5955114.html
 https://www.abc.es/cultura/musica/abci-entrevista-ricardo-llorca-201210030000_noticia.html
 https://www.juilliard.edu/music/faculty/llorca-ricardo

Spanish classical composers
Spanish male classical composers
20th-century classical composers
21st-century classical composers
Spanish opera composers
Male opera composers
People from Alicante
Living people
20th-century Spanish musicians
20th-century Spanish male musicians
21st-century male musicians
1958 births